Delta is the largest city in Millard County, Utah, United States. It is located in the northeastern area of Millard County along the Sevier River and is surrounded by farmland. The population was 3,436 at the 2010 census.

History
Delta was originally a railroad switch called Aiken. In 1905 Aiken was renamed Melville when Millard County began plans to set up irrigation and a dam. People purchased land for 50 cents an acre as long as they agreed to develop a 40-acre lot. The name was changed again because of the similarities between Melville and Millville, another town in Utah. The name was changed on 12 May 1908 to Burtner. The name was finally changed to Delta on May 11, 1911. The name is quite fitting as the area was a delta of the Sevier River.

Topaz Relocation Camp

During World War II, after the attack on Pearl Harbor, tens of thousands of Japanese-Americans were gathered up and placed in 10 incarceration camps to protect military installations from espionage. One of these camps, then entitled Central Utah Relocation Center, was located near Delta and filled with former residents of the San Francisco Bay Area.

The Topaz Museum, located in Delta, works to preserve important sites at the relocation center and to provide information on the history of the camps.

Great Basin Museum
A history of the area is kept and displayed at The Great Basin Museum.

Gunnison Massacre Site

John Williams Gunnison was leading a federal surveying team near the Sevier Lake. He was ambushed by the Pahvant Indians and killed.

Geography

Delta is located at  (39.353145, −112.573656).

Climate
Delta experiences a cold semi-arid climate (Köppen BSk) with hot summers and cold winters. Because of Delta's altitude and aridity, temperatures drop quickly after sunset, especially in the summer. Winters are cold. Daytime highs in the winter are usually above freezing, but nighttime lows drop well below freezing, occasionally falling below . Delta's climate is similar to that of Salt Lake City, but much more arid.

Sevier River and Lake
The Sevier River flows near Delta. The Sevier River is generally used for irrigation before it reaches its eventual end, the dry Sevier Lake.

DMAD
DMAD is the initials for the Deseret Melville Abraham and Delta water company.

Just upstream of Delta, the Sevier River is dammed to provide irrigation water, reservoir storage, and cooling water for IPP Intermountain Power Project. This reservoir is referred to as the DMAD.

Agriculture is a major economic force in Delta and the Sevier valley.

Gunnison Bend Reservoir
Downstream of Delta, the Sevier River is dammed again for irrigation and reservoir storage. This reservoir is named Gunnison Bend Reservoir in honor of John Williams Gunnison.

Demographics

As of the census of 2000, there were 3,209 people, 1,006 households, and 780 families residing in the city. The population density was 1,018.3 people per square mile (393.3/km2). There were 1,106 housing units at an average density of 351.0 per square mile (135.6/km2). The racial makeup of the city was 94.61% White, 0.06% African American, 0.97% Native American, 0.12% Asian, 0.28% Pacific Islander, 3.15% from other races, and 0.81% from two or more races. Hispanic or Latino of any race were 10.10% of the population.

There were 1,006 households, out of which 48.6% had children under the age of 18 living with them, 65.3% were married couples living together, 9.0% had a female householder with no husband present, and 22.4% were non-families. 20.8% of all households were made up of individuals, and 10.2% had someone living alone who was 65 years of age or older. The average household size was 3.15, and the average family size was 3.71.

In the city, the population was spread out, with 38.7% under 18, 8.2% from 18 to 24, 24.3% from 25 to 44, 18.1% from 45 to 64, and 10.7% who were 65 years of age or older. The median age was 28 years. For every 100 females, there were 103.4 males. For every 100 females aged 18 and over, there were 94.9 males.

The median income for a household in the city was $37,773, and the median income for a family was $43,952. Males had a median income of $37,340 versus $21,369 for females. The per capita income for the city was $13,273. About 10.1% of families and 13.0% of the population were below the poverty line, including 16.5% of those under age 18 and 5.4% of those aged 65 or over.

Economy

Intermountain Power Project (IPP)

One of the main sources of income for Delta is a power plant operated by the Intermountain Power Agency, known as the Intermountain Power Project or I.P.P. It is also referred to as Intermountain Power Service Corporation or I.P.S.C. This coal-powered power plant supplies power for much of Los Angeles county in California. The plant was originally designed for four units, but only two have been built. Each unit produces 950 megawatts of electricity.

Materion Natural Resources
Materion's, formerly Brush Wellman, beryllium refining plant is located north of Delta in Millard County. This is one of the few sources of concentrated beryllium in the world. The plant is a mill and finishing facility for beryllium, a high-strength, lightweight metal alloy used in military, aerospace, and medical industries. The ore for the plant is trucked from Materion's mine, located in the Topaz-Spor Mountains, 50 miles west, in Juab County. This is North America's only developed source of beryllium. The facility is located here due to its access to the railway and major highways 6 and 50.

Graymont Lime
Graymont Lime has a plant in the Cricket Mountains, about 32.5 miles southwest of Delta. It is one of the ten largest lime plants in the United States. It was previously owned by Continental Lime which Graymont Lime purchased.

Alfalfa
Alfalfa hay is the main crop of the Delta area. Due to the dry climate in the Delta region, farmers can control the moisture content of the hay when it is baled. This is very important to prohibit mold growth.

Dairy
Delta is home to many dairy farmers who may ship the milk out of the county.

Science

Cosmic Ray Center
Delta is home to the Lon and Mary Watson Cosmic Ray Center, the main staging area for the Telescope Array Project experiment.

Fossils and minerals

A great attraction of Millard County's economy is the digging of fossils. Trilobite fossils are relatively common in the region west of Delta (part of the House Range's Wheeler Shale). Several local companies maintain fossil dig areas where they allow visitors to dig their own fossils for a small fee.

Near Delta is a mountain called Topaz Mountain, which derives its name from the topaz that is abundant in the area.
Other minerals and rocks that are prevalent near Delta include obsidian, opal, and geodes.

Education

Schools 
Delta currently has three public schools: Delta elementary school, Delta Middle school, and Delta High school. Delta also has a vocational school with the Delta Technical Center, which offers many Technical classes, including welding, Machining/metalworking, and Woodworking

Delta South Elementary 
Delta South Elementary School is located at 450 South Center Street in Delta, Utah. DSES was originally built in 1982 to accommodate the growth in population due to the construction of the Intermountain Power Plant. The new school was finished in time for the 1983–84 school year and housed grades K-4. In 1989 the fifth grade was moved back to the elementary school. Because of declining enrollment figures, Delta South Elementary was closed in 2009. Delta Early Childhood Center was created using two-thirds of the South Elementary building to accommodate preschool and kindergarten students in West Millard County. At the end of the 2014–15 school year, the Delta area schools were reconfigured, placing all students in preschool, kindergarten, and first and second grades at Delta South Elementary School.

Delta Middle School 
Delta Middle School serves approximately 420 students in the sixth, seventh, and eighth grades and is located in Delta, Utah. Its students come from the City of Delta and several smaller communities in Millard County.

DMS has a staff of 21 teachers, nine instructional assistants, and eleven additional support personnel.

Delta High School 
Delta High School is a public school located in rural central Utah, drawing students from several small outlying communities. With a new school and a diverse student population, Delta High is the hub of an agricultural-based community. According to the 2013-2014 DHS report card Delta had 549 students enrolled from the grades 9th-12th and an 87% graduation rate.

Entertainment

Snow Goose Festival
The Snow Goose Festival occurs every winter as the geese migrating through Delta stop at Gunnison Bend Reservoir.

Demolition Derby
Each July 4, the Hinckley Lions Club sponsors a demolition derby at the Millard County Fairgrounds. The derby attracts crowds of over 3,000 people. It is one of the largest derbies in the United States, with up to eleven rounds of competition, including pickup trucks, figure 8 compact car competition, powder puff, a championship round, and a wipe-out round. Following the derby, there is a fireworks display sponsored by Delta City.

Days of the Old West Rodeo
A Professional Rodeo Cowboys Association (PRCA) Rodeo takes place every year.

See also

 List of cities and towns in Utah

References

External links

 

Cities in Utah
Cities in Millard County, Utah
Populated places established in 1907
1907 establishments in Utah
Great Basin National Heritage Area